The EFL Championship Manager of the Month is an association football award that recognises the manager adjudged best for each month of the season in the EFL Championship, the second tier of English football. The recipient is chosen by a panel assembled by the League's sponsor and announced alongside the League One and League Two Manager of the Month awards at the beginning of the following month. For sponsorship reasons, from its inception in 2004 until 2010 it was known as the Coca-Cola Manager of the Month award, with the Coca-Cola company sponsoring the league during that period. From the 2010–11 season until the end of the 2012–13 season the league was sponsored by npower and the award was known as the npower Manager of the Month. In July 2013, it was announced that Sky Bet would become the new sponsor of the English Football League, and since August 2013 the award has been known as the Sky Bet Manager of the Month. In November 2017 it was announced that Sky Bet and the EFL had agreed for Sky Bet to continue its sponsorship up until 2024.

Coca-Cola had agreed a three-year deal to become the new sponsor of the English Football League early in 2004, and in June 2004 it was announced that the League would be completely re-branded. The First Division, which had been the second tier of English football since 1992 when 22 clubs broke away to form the Premier League, was renamed The Championship. The Premier League already awarded a Manager of the Month award, since the start of the 1993–94 season, and Coca-Cola introduced a Manager of the Month award for the Championship when they became sponsors at the start of the 2004–05 season; the first recipient was Paul Jewell for his achievements in August 2004 with Wigan Athletic.

Neil Warnock has won the award a record eleven times.

The awards are designed and manufactured in the United Kingdom by bespoke awards company Gaudio Awards.

List of winners

Multiple winners
Up to and including the February 2023 award.
 The below table lists all the people that have won on more than one occasion.

Awards won by nationality
Up to and including the February 2023 award.

Awards won by club
Up to and including the February 2023 award.

See also
EFL Championship Player of the Month

Footnotes

References

General

Specific

External links
Manager of the Month at the League Managers Association
Bespoke Award Manufacturers

Manager of the Month
English Football League trophies and awards
Football managers in England
Coaching awards
Awards established in 2004